Guillermo López Langarica (1968 – 25 September 2008) was a Mexican YouTube celebrity, who accidentally rose to fame in 2007. Prior to his death he was mostly known as 'El Canaca', (the Canaca guy). More recently he is remembered as 'Don Memo'.

Early life 

He was born in 1968 in El Salto, Jalisco.

Rise to fame
López Langarica came to the public spotlight when he was detained in Guadalajara, Jalisco, for speed-driving under the influence of alcohol in 2002. He was interviewed and featured in a TV show titled 'El Show de la Barandilla', which mostly aired comical police interventions against drunkards, through Canal 4 de Guadalajara, a company belonging to the Televisa consortium. A few years later, his video was uploaded to YouTube and quickly gained nationwide fame.

In the video, López Langarica explains to the reporter how he was wrongly detained, as he was drunk-driving but had not 'crashed yet'. He also claimed the police officers robbed him of $50,000 Mexican pesos, explaining he had a pack of a hundred $500 pesos bills. (Y mis cincuenta mil pesos ¿qué?) When asked about his income's origins he claimed to work at Promotora Mexicana Gaitán, a commerce located at 6-6-30-6-71-3-3-3-3 (with the then recent change from 7- to 8-digit phone numbers gone into effect two years earlier, in his alcohol-induced state he forgot to mention a 3 before the phone number). He identified himself as the owner's son, a man named Miguel Ángel Gaytán Uribe, who also allegedly served as President of an organization called 'CANACA', acronym which, he said, stands for 'Centrales de Abastos de la República Mexicana'. Finally, he asks the cameraman to tape his right ankle, angrily accusing the officers of restraining him like a pig. (¡Me amarraron como puerco!)

The YouTube video was an instant phenomenon, receiving over ten million views to date. López Langarica rose to national fame because of his comical explanation of events, places, and his catchphrases '¿Y qué? No he chocado' (So what? I haven't crashed yet), 'Apúntele bien' ("Write this down"), 'Soy hijo del papá' (I'm son of the father) referring to his relation with "the owner", '¡Me amarraron como puerco!' (They tied me like a pig!!), and his definition of the acronym CANACA.

Truthfulness of statements 
In Mexico there is no organization by the name 'CANACA'. Some of the closest examples would be the Cámara Nacional de Comercio (CANACO), the Confederación Nacional de Agrupaciones de Comerciantes de Centros de Abastos (CONACCA), and the Cámara Nacional de Autotransportes de Carga (CANACAR).

Promotora Mexicana Gaitán (PROMEGA) does exist, it is an enterprise which imports/exports fruits and vegetables, specially strawberries, with offices both in Guadalajara and Mexico City. The former is located at 6th Street's 630. The phone number is +52(33)3671-3333. Whether López Langarica worked there or not is unknown. No one by the name Miguel Ángel Gaytán works at PROMEGA, but there is a Miguel Ángel Gaytán Uribe who served as the vigilancy committee's president at the Unión de Comerciantes del Mercado de Abastos de Guadalajara (UCMA).

Death
On the night of September 25, 2008, López Langarica was run over in Guadalajara by a Dodge Neon, driven by a heavily intoxicated woman named Silvia Teresa Borbón Valenzuela. He was totally sober. When the police arrived, the woman claimed someone had put the body under her car. The fact immediately made it to national news and was featured in Mexico's most prominent news reports and newspapers.

Legacy
Numerous parodies and tributes spawned after the original video's popularity, such as imitations, animated versions, musical remixes, and even religious prayers. Other Mexican drunken celebrities have gained fame, such as Dios Eolo (God Aeolus), Dulce Sarahí Villarreal, the 'Ni Merga' guy, the Sicarios de Montemorelos (Montemorelos killers), the 'Tengo Miedo' (I'm Afraid) guy, and the 'Me Estoy yendo por la Banqueta', (I'm on the Sidewalk) amongst others . After López Langarica's death numerous tribute and farewell videos appeared in YouTube. T-shirts imprinted with his famous phrases or the Mexican soccer team Atlas's logo are for sale in some street markets. Many YouTube users posted several in memoriam comments in his famous video, while some users encourage fans to call and denounce Silvia Teresa Borbón, even providing alleged personal data, such as her home address, and her cell phone number.

More recently, some people in Guadalajara claim to have witnessed apparitions by López Langarica's ghost, leading users on the net to jokingly refer to him as 'San Canaca'.

See also
 El Fua, another Mexican Internet meme

References

External links
.
.

Internet memes
1968 births
2008 deaths
Mexican victims of crime
People from Guadalajara, Jalisco
Prisoners and detainees of Mexico
Road incident deaths in Mexico
Pedestrian road incident deaths